Kenneth Davitian (born June 19, 1953) is an American actor, best known for his role as Borat's producer Azamat Bagatov in the 2006 comedy film Borat.

Early life and education

Kenneth Davitian was born in Los Angeles on June 19, 1953 to an Armenian American family from Montebello, California. His maternal grandparents were survivors of the Armenian genocide. His father, a Red Army soldier during World War II, was captured by Wehrmacht forces and placed at an Armenian Legion camp in Stuttgart. After the end of the war, he immigrated to the United States through the efforts of George Mardikian. Davitian worked in his father's waste management company. He graduated from Garfield High School in East Los Angeles and Whittier College.

His teenage idol was Burt Reynolds, who greatly influenced his choice of becoming an actor. Davitian would go on to perform in the film Pocket Listing, which also featured Reynolds.

Davitian is fluent in Armenian; he speaks in Armenian as Azamat in Borat.

Restaurant ventures
Davitian founded a restaurant in 2003 called The Dip, which was located in Los Angeles. His son Robert used to run his baseball-themed hot dog restaurant The Infield in Sherman Oaks, which boasted a hot dog, conceived by Charlie Sheen, called the "Charlie Sheen Dog with Tiger Blood".

Filmography

Film

Television

Video games

Music videos

References

External links

Ken Davitian is enjoying, very much, his Hollywood high five
Guardian – First Sight

1953 births
Living people
Male actors from Los Angeles
American male film actors
American male television actors
American people of Armenian descent
Whittier College alumni
People from Montebello, California